Fi Van Hoof (born 3 July 1941) is a Belgian football midfielder and later manager.

References

1941 births
Living people
Belgian footballers
K.V. Mechelen players
Belgian Pro League players
Challenger Pro League players
Association football midfielders
Belgian football managers
K.V. Mechelen managers
K.S.C. Lokeren Oost-Vlaanderen managers
People from Bonheiden
Footballers from Antwerp Province